Richard Maher is a British screenwriter, author and playwright. Born in Bristol in 1957, he graduated from Queens' College, Cambridge in 1979. His television work includes writing for Pie in the Sky and Taggart, and co-creating the ITV1 drama Making Waves with Ted Childs.

References

External links
 

1957 births
20th-century British male writers
21st-century British male writers
Alumni of Queens' College, Cambridge
British male dramatists and playwrights
British male screenwriters
British television writers
Living people
Place of birth missing (living people)
Writers from Bristol